Richard Thomas Hall (31 May 1823 – 21 August 1889) was a British railway engineer.

Early life
In 1839 he became pupil of his uncle, civil engineer Richard Thomas. After his pupilage in 1844 Thomas Hall was employed by civil engineer Joseph Locke.

Railway career 
In 1848 he was appointed engineer and superintendent of the  gauge Redruth and Chasewater Railway in Cornwall for the next 20 years.

South Africa 
In 1868, the Cape Copper Mining Company hired Thomas Hall to survey and construct the  narrow gauge Namaqualand Railway in the Cape Colony. In March 1875, one year before the completion of the railway, Thomas Hall accepted the appointment of railway engineer to the South African Republic and started surveying the  gauge Pretoria to Delagoa Bay railway of the Netherlands-South African Railway Company.

When the South African Republic became British territory in 1878, he became maintenance engineer and retired from government service in 1886. He died on 21 August 1889.

Other narrow gauge pioneers 
 Abraham Fitzgibbon
 Carl Abraham Pihl
 Everard Calthrop
 Paul Decauville
 Robert Fairlie

References

British railway civil engineers
History of rail transport in South Africa
1823 births
1889 deaths